

Endpoint was a hardcore band from Louisville, Kentucky. Many of their songs dealt with social and political issues.

The band was founded in 1988 as Deathwatch. They released only one record, posthumously in 1991, which was a split 7-inch with another local band named Crain. In 1988, the band changed their name and the following year, with most of the original line-up, released a 17-song album on cassette through the Slamdek Record Company label. The album, called If The Spirits Are Willing, was available in Louisville area stores in May 1989. However, following this release, the band got a new rhythm section and went on to write "In a Time of Hate," which was held up in production but was released in early 1991 on Conversion Records. The following year, the band released "Catharsis," on Doghouse Records. Endpoint released two more records and toured the United States extensively and Europe between 1992 and 1994.

In 1994, the band finally decided to call it quits after a seven-year career. On December 31, they played their last and largest show for over two thousand people in, of course, Louisville.  In 1995, the band released their last record, appropriately entitled "The Last Record".

They reunited for two shows in 2010 as a benefit for Jason Noble of Rodan, who had been diagnosed with cancer.

A large number of Endpoint's songs were political. They have been described as having a "soaring pro-community message".

Members
 Rob Pennington - vocals
 Duncan Barlow - Guitar
 Lee Fetzer - drums
 Rusty Sohm - drums
 Chad Castetter - Guitar
 Pat McClimans - Bass
 Kyle Crabtree - drums
 Kyle Noltemeyer - bass
 Jason Graff - bass
 Jason Hayden - bass
 Curtis Mead - bass
 David Wagenschutz - drums
 Ben Clark - bass
 Thommy Browne - drums

Discography

Albums
 Crain and Deathwatch Split 7-inch - Slamdek
 If the Spirits Are Willing - Slamdek
 Endpoint and Sunspring Split 7-inch- Slamdek
 Endpoint and Sunspring Split 7-inch-Written in Rock: Songs of Rick Springfield - Slamdek
 EP2 7-inch - Break Even Point
 Idiots 7-inch/CD - Doghouse
 Every 26 Seconds 7-inch - Doghouse
 Slamdek Discography 1988-1991 - Slamdek
 In a Time of Hate - Conversion
 Catharsis - Doghouse
 After Taste - Doghouse
 The Last Record - Doghouse

References

Sources
Slamdek A to Z: The Illustrated History of Louisville's Slamdek Record Company 1986-1995 by K. Scott Ritcher
http://history.louisvillehardcore.com/index.php?title=Endpoint

External links
 

Hardcore punk groups from Kentucky
Musical groups from Louisville, Kentucky
Rock music groups from Kentucky
1988 establishments in Kentucky
Musical groups established in 1988
Doghouse Records artists